Two ships of the Japanese Navy have been named Iki:

  was previously the Russian battleship Imperator Nikolai I launched in 1889 and renamed on capture by Japan in 1905. She was expended as a target in 1915.
  was an  launched in 1943 and sunk in 1944

Japanese Navy ship names
Imperial Japanese Navy ship names